The Roman Catholic Diocese of Bydgoszcz is a diocese located in the city of Bydgoszcz in the Ecclesiastical province of Gniezno in Poland.

History

 February 24, 2004: Established as Diocese of Bydgoscz

Bishops
 Jan Tyrawa (24 February 2004 – 12 May 2021)
 Krzysztof Włodarczyk (21 September 2021 – present)

See also
Roman Catholicism in Poland

Sources
 GCatholic.org
 Catholic Hierarchy
  Diocese website

Roman Catholic dioceses in Poland
Christian organizations established in 2004
Bydgoszcz
Roman Catholic dioceses and prelatures established in the 21st century